The 2011 Zumpango earthquake occurred at  with a moment magnitude of 6.5 and a maximum Mercalli intensity of VII (Very strong). Its epicenter was located in the city Zumpango, Guerrero, roughly equidistant between the metropolitan areas of Mexico City and Acapulco. The quake was felt in Guerrero, Michoacán, Mexico State, Mexico City and Puebla.

The resulting damage was minimal, but during the panic people evacuated buildings in Mexico City.

Impact
Damage was reported as light though a secondary toll highway between Acapulco and Mexico City was blocked in several places due to landslides. The shaking was also responsible for knocking out power to around 82,000 people, and disrupting cell phone service in the capital. In Acapulco,  from the epicenter, no injuries or damage were reported. It was reported by Mexico City's mayor, Marcelo Ebrard, that normal operations were continuing at Mexico City International Airport.

Casualties
Several injuries and one death was reported after rocks were dislodged from a hill and tumbled onto the Autopista del Sol (Highway of the Sun) and into a truck. The other deaths were reported as one person killed during the collapse of a house's roof in Iguala, and another was listed in Ixcateopan de Cuauhtémoc with unknown circumstances.

Aftermath
An early report from the United States Geological Survey had the magnitude at 6.7 but it was later lowered to 6.5. According to the Secretariat of the Interior there were four aftershocks within the first 45 minutes of the main shock. Also stated was that since this was a moderate event a large number of aftershocks were not expected. Seven of the aftershocks were close to the epicenter and two more were in the state of Chiapas.

Although the event occurred in the coastal state of Guerrero, no tsunami warning was given for the earthquake. The National Oceanic and Atmospheric Administration stated that based on the location, magnitude, and historical tsunami records, no advisory or warning would be necessary for the west coast of the United States, British Columbia, or Alaska.

See also 
Geography of Mexico
List of earthquakes in 2011
List of earthquakes in Mexico

References

External links
M6.5 - Guerrero, Mexico – United States Geological Survey

Earthquakes in Mexico
2011 in Mexico
2011 earthquakes
December 2011 events in Mexico
2011 disasters in Mexico